Gotarrendura is a municipality located in the province of Ávila, Castile and León, Spain. According to the 2011 census (INE), the municipality had a population of 173 inhabitants.

The parents of St. Teresa of Ávila (1515–1582) married in the village and it has been suggested that the saint was born there.

Architecture and culture
The main buildings are the San Miguel Church, the Santa Teresa's dovecote and the López Berrón ethnographic museum.

Gotarrendura has won the International Award for Liveable Communities 2011 (Category A towns & cities popn up to 20,000) (award from 
the United Nations Environment Programme).

References

External links
 Town Hall official webpage

Municipalities in the Province of Ávila